Benjamin Keith Davies (born 11 August 1995) is an English professional footballer who plays as a centre-back or left-back for Scottish Premiership club Rangers.

Davies spent most of his early career with Preston North End, and had loan spells with York City, Tranmere Rovers, Southport, Newport County and Fleetwood Town. He moved to Liverpool in 2021, but never played for the club and was loaned to Sheffield United before he was sold to Scottish club Rangers in 2022.

Club career

Preston North End

Born in Barrow-in-Furness, Cumbria, Davies signed with the youth system at Preston North End after being spotted playing for Furness Rovers aged 11. He made his debut for the first team in a home 2–2 draw against Coventry City on 26 January 2013 at the age of 17 years, completing 83 minutes before being replaced by David Buchanan. During the match, he provided an assist for Nicky Wroe's 60th-minute equaliser and picked up a yellow card for a foul on Cyrus Christie. He drew praise from Preston manager Graham Westley, who likened Davies' transition into the first team to that of George Boyd at Stevenage. Davies kept his place for the next match at home against Shreswbury Town. His second match did not go as well as his debut, conceding a 90th-minute penalty (for which he picked up a booking), fouling Marvin Morgan in the penalty box. He was substituted shortly after for Paul Huntington, with Preston to ultimately lose the match. He signed a one-year professional contract at Preston, with an option to extend for a second year, in May 2013, after being named the club's Scholar of the Year for the 2012–13 season.

Davies joined League Two club York City on 19 July 2013 on a one-month loan. He made his debut in a 1–0 home win over Northampton Town on 3 August 2013, in the first match of 2013–14. On 15 August 2013, his loan was extended until January 2014, having appeared in York's opening two matches. He played 47 times for York City as they qualified for the 2014 League Two play-offs, but lost 1–0 to Fleetwood Town in the semi-final. He signed a two-year contract extension with Preston in May 2014.

Davies joined Tranmere Rovers of League Two on 19 September 2014 on a one-month loan and made his debut a day later in a 2–1 home defeat to Exeter City. He played in four matches for Tranmere, returning to Preston once the loan ended on 22 October 2014. He joined National League club Southport on 11 September 2015 on a one-month loan, and made his debut a day later in a 2–1 away defeat to Forest Green Rovers. Davies was recalled by Preston on 20 October 2015, to provide cover for injured defensive players, having made nine appearances for Southport.

On 7 January 2016, Davies joined Newport County of League Two on a one-month youth loan, subsequently extended until the end of 2015–16. He made 19 league appearances for Newport County.

On 2 January 2017, Davies joined League One club Fleetwood Town on loan for the remainder of 2016–17. He made his debut for the club on the same day, starting a 1–0 away win over Shrewsbury Town. He made 22 league appearances for Fleetwood Town and scored once as they qualified for the play-offs, though Fleetwood were knocked out by Bradford City in the semi-final. Davies signed a new three-year contract in July 2017. He signed a new three-and-a-half-year deal in March 2018. Davies won Preston's Young Player of the Year award for the 2017–18 season. He won Preston's Player of the year award for the 2018–19 season, as well as the Sir Tom Finney Player of the Year award.

Liverpool
Davies signed for Premier League club Liverpool on 1 February 2021 on a long-term contract for an undisclosed fee, reported to be an initial fee of £500,000, plus £1.1 million in performance-related add-ons. Sepp van den Berg also moved in the opposite direction on loan for the rest of the season as part of the deal. Davies did not make an appearance for Liverpool during the remainder of the 2020–21 season. He joined newly relegated Championship club Sheffield United on 16 August on loan for the 2021–22 season. He scored his first goal for Sheffield United on 23 February 2022 when he came on as a substitute and scored a late winner in a 1-0 win against Blackburn Rovers.

Rangers
Davies signed for Scottish Premiership club Rangers on 19 July 2022 on a four-year contract for an undisclosed fee, reported to be an initial £3 million, potentially rising to £4 million in add-ons. He made his debut for the club as a substitute against Belgian side Union Saint-Gilloise during a UEFA Champions League qualifier loss on 2 August.

Style of play
Davies is a left-sided centre-back who can also play at left-back.

Career statistics

References

External links

Profile at the Rangers F.C. website

1995 births
Living people
Footballers from Barrow-in-Furness
Footballers from Cumbria
English footballers
Association football defenders
Preston North End F.C. players
York City F.C. players
Tranmere Rovers F.C. players
Southport F.C. players
Newport County A.F.C. players
Fleetwood Town F.C. players
Liverpool F.C. players
Sheffield United F.C. players
Rangers F.C. players
English Football League players
National League (English football) players
Scottish Professional Football League players